Nonsuch may refer to:

Ships
Nonsuch (1650 ship), the English ship that sailed into Hudson Bay in 1668–69
Nonsuch (1781 ship), built in Calcutta to serve as a merchantman or warship
Nonsuch (1794 ship), later renamed Vigilant, an American schooner
, a US warship from 1813
Nonsuch (sailboat), a cat-rigged sailboat manufactured in Canada
, a Canadian Naval Reserve division in Edmonton, Alberta
, name of several English and British warships

Buildings in England
Nonsuch House, a 1579 building on London Bridge
Nonsuch Palace, an English royal palace built by Henry VIII in Surrey
Nonsuch Mansion, a mansion in Nonsuch Park, London

Places
Nonsuch Bay, Antigua and Barbuda
Nonsuch, County Westmeath, a townland in Mayne civil parish, barony of Fore, County Westmeath, Ireland
Nonsuch Island, Bermuda, an island in, being restored to pre-colonial ecology
Nonsuch Park, a public park in the London Borough of Sutton, part of the larger park associated with the palace
Nonsuch, a village in Portland Parish, Jamaica

Other
Nonsuch (album), an alternative rock album by British band XTC
Nonsuch High School, a girls' Grammar school in Cheam, Surrey UK, near the park
Nonsuch, a publishing imprint of The History Press
HMS Nonsuch, a fictional ship in C.S. Forester's Horatio Hornblower novels; see 
Treaty of Nonsuch, a treaty made at the palace between England and the Dutch Republic in 1585

See also

Nonesuch (disambiguation)